Malu is a station on Line 11 of the Shanghai Metro. It opened on December 31, 2009.

References 
 

Railway stations in Shanghai
Line 11, Shanghai Metro
Shanghai Metro stations in Jiading District
Railway stations in China opened in 2009